Pitcairnia caduciflora is a species of plant in the family Bromeliaceae. It is endemic to Ecuador, where it is known from only one site in Pastaza Province. It is an epiphyte that grows in the forests of the lower Andes, and it is threatened by habitat destruction.

References

caduciflora
Endemic flora of Ecuador
Endangered plants
Taxonomy articles created by Polbot